Jan Theron (25 August 1930 – 24 November 1993) was a South African wrestler. He competed at the 1952 Summer Olympics and the 1956 Summer Olympics.

References

1930 births
1993 deaths
South African male sport wrestlers
Olympic wrestlers of South Africa
Wrestlers at the 1952 Summer Olympics
Wrestlers at the 1956 Summer Olympics
People from Setsoto Local Municipality
Commonwealth Games medallists in wrestling
Commonwealth Games gold medallists for South Africa
Wrestlers at the 1954 British Empire and Commonwealth Games
Wrestlers at the 1958 British Empire and Commonwealth Games
Medallists at the 1954 British Empire and Commonwealth Games
Medallists at the 1958 British Empire and Commonwealth Games